24th Ohio Battery was an artillery battery that served in the Union Army during the American Civil War.

Service
The 24th Ohio Battery was organized at Camp Dennison near Cincinnati, Ohio and mustered in for three years service on August 24, 1863, under the command of Captain John L. Hill.

The battery was ordered to Cincinnati, September 22, then moved to Johnson's Island, Sandusky Bay, Ohio, November 10, and served guard duty there until August 6, 1864. Moved to Camp Chase August 6, then to Camp Douglas, Chicago, Illinois, August 27, and served guard duty there June 10, 1865.

The 24th Ohio Battery mustered out of service on June 24, 1865, at Camp Dennison.

Casualties
The battery lost a total of 6 men during service, all due to disease.

Commanders
 Captain John L. Hill

See also

 List of Ohio Civil War units
 Ohio in the Civil War

References
 Dyer, Frederick H.  A Compendium of the War of the Rebellion (Des Moines, IA:  Dyer Pub. Co.), 1908.
 Ohio Roster Commission. Official Roster of the Soldiers of the State of Ohio in the War on the Rebellion, 1861–1865, Compiled Under the Direction of the Roster Commission (Akron, OH: Werner Co.), 1886–1895.
 Reid, Whitelaw. Ohio in the War: Her Statesmen, Her Generals, and Soldiers (Cincinnati, OH: Moore, Wilstach, & Baldwin), 1868. 
Attribution

External links
 Ohio in the Civil War: 24th Ohio Battery by Larry Stevens

Military units and formations established in 1863
Military units and formations disestablished in 1865
Units and formations of the Union Army from Ohio
O
1863 establishments in Ohio